For lists of British full generals, see:

List of British Army full generals
List of Royal Marines full generals